David-Alexandre Beauregard (born January 28, 1976) is a Canadian former professional ice hockey player who played 14 years in the minor leagues.

Early years
Beauregard was born in Montreal, Quebec. From a very young age, Beauregard had been a scorer. When he was seven years old, he scored 230 goals in 43 games. As a junior playing in the Quebec Major Junior Hockey League Beauregard scored 224 points in 190 games; however, in his draft year he was only 5 feet 10 inches and weighed 165 pounds - too small to be selected early in the National Hockey League (NHL) draft. Despite his size, the San Jose Sharks had shown an interest in Beauregard and, on June 28, 1994, the Sharks selected him in the 11th round of the 1994 NHL Entry Draft, 271st overall.

After being drafted, Beauregard returned to the Saint-Hyacinthe Laser of the Quebec Major Junior Hockey League to continue his development. Beauregard believed that his NHL dream was on track, but on October 16, 1994, while playing in a game against the Granby Bisons, Beauregard lost all sight in his left eye after the high stick of Xavier Delisle managed to find the gap in the visor he was wearing. Despite this, he still scored on the breakaway.

Because the NHL prohibits anyone who is blind in one eye from signing a contract, Beauregard's NHL dream was over, and he was advised to retire from hockey. Refusing to give up the sport he loved, Beauregard made his return to major junior hockey several months later. He has since said "I was one of the worst players on the ice. I’d lost my depth perception and it took me two months to get some sense of where the puck was."

Despite his poor self-perception, after returning to the Lasers he appeared in another 22 games during the 1994–95 season, scoring points in 12 of them to help the Lasers into the post-season. In the playoffs, he scored another four points in five games, and that year he was awarded the organisation's Humanitarian of the Year award.

Beauregard continued his junior hockey career in the 1995–96 season with the Moncton Alpines before switching mid-season to the Hull Olympiques. Between the two teams, he would total 73 points in just over 50 games. He made the post season with the Olympiques where he scored 7 goals and 9 assists in 18 playoff games.

He started his last season of junior eligibility with the Olympiques, but again switched mid-season, this time to join the Shawinigan Cataractes. During this 1996–97 season, he was able to secure a five-game tryout with the Kentucky Thoroughblades of the American Hockey League (AHL).  Given only limited ice time, the 21-year-old made the most of it by scoring three points. However, with no shots on goal, it was not enough to convince the AHL team to give a professional contract to a player with just one eye. At the end of the 1996–97 season, his junior career was over, and the Sharks had by now dropped him from their protected list - but Beauregard continued to pursue a professional career in hockey.

Professional career
For the 1997–98 season, he signed a contract with the Wichita Thunder of the Central Hockey League. Several times during this season he was called up to the Kansas City Blades of the higher-level International Hockey League where he played in 15 games, but for most of the season he remained with the Thunder where he scored 42 goals and 29 assist for 71 points and the CHL Rookie of the Year award.

Beauregard's stint with the Blades marked the end of his playing time in the higher minor leagues, but he has never given up on professional hockey. Bouncing around the minor leagues for the next several years, Beauregard skated in the United Hockey League (UHL) with the Muskegon Fury and Flint Generals during the 1998–99 season; and in the ECHL with the Greensboro Generals and the Charlotte Checkers during the 1999–2000 season. In the 2000–01 season he returned to the UHL, where he played two seasons with the Port Huron Border Cats, before joining the Fort Wayne Komets for the 2002–03 and 2003–04 seasons. It was during the 2003–04 season that Beauregard made a brief return to his native Quebec where he played 18 games in the short-lived QSMHL with the Saint-Jean Mission.

For the 2004–05 season, Beauregard continued his tour of the UHL, icing for the Port Huron Beacons until the end of the season (when, after failing to make the playoffs, they would move to become the Roanoke Valley Vipers). Beauregard made another brief return to Quebec with the Sorel-Tracy Mission, suiting up just once during the 2004–05 season before following the Beacons' franchise to Roanoake for the 2005–06 season. Beauregard, now a veteran with ten years of professional experience, was the only member of the Vipers to have been selected in the NHL draft.   Beauregard's successful season with the Vipers, with 76 points in 56 games, led to a late season move to the Danbury Trashers organisation where Beauregard starred in the post-season with 23 points in 18 games. In a 2005 interview he remarked "I still play because I still love to play. I get up in the morning and I can’t wait to go to practice. The pay is pretty good, and it’s a fine game. I’ll play as long as I can."

Beauregard left the Trashers in the summer of 2006 following the fraud scandal which enveloped the organisation.  He then spent the next two seasons back in the Central Hockey League with his old team, the Tulsa Oilers. During the 2006–07 and 2007–08 seasons, he was a regular scorer with the Oilers, although not as prolific as his 50 goals seasons in the UHL.

For the 2008–09 season, Beauregard moved into European hockey with the Manchester Phoenix. Beauregard was paired on a line with player-coach Tony Hand.  A career season would follow for Beauregard, and he would amass 107 points in 68 gamest.  Beauregard was regarded by many Phoenix fans as the greatest player ever to wear the shirt and this was recognised by countless post-season awards, including the Elite Ice Hockey League (EIHL)'s Player of the Season, as well as being selected to the All-Star First Team. Beauregard's play would be a major factor into propelling the Phoenix into both domestic cup finals and the post-season.  Despite the on-ice success in Manchester, financial problems dogged the Phoenix and in the summer of 2009 the organisation announced that for the 2009–10 season it would ice in the EPL and operate on a much smaller budget.  Consequently, Beauregard, as well as much of the senior squad, was released.

For the 2009–10 season, Beauregard (along with Manchester Phoenix teammate Kenton Smith) travelled to Italy to join the HC Valpellice Bulldogs to play Serie A hockey, but before the season was done he was once again back in the CHL with the Tulsa Oilers.

For the 2010–11 season, Beauregard returned to the UK, signing to ice for the Challenge Cup champions of the EIHL - the Nottingham Panthers.

Beauregard started the 2012–13 season with the Nottingham Panthers, but finished it with the Tulsa Oilers.

Awards
1994-95: Humanitarian of the Year (Saint-Hyacinthe Laser)
1997-98: CHL Rookie of the Year
2008-09: EIHL's Player of the Season
2008-09: First Team All-Star (EIHL)

Career statistics

References

External links
 

1976 births
Canadian ice hockey left wingers
Charlotte Checkers (1993–2010) players
Danbury Trashers players
Flint Generals players
Fort Wayne Komets players
Greensboro Generals players
Hull Olympiques players
Kansas City Blades players
Kentucky Thoroughblades players
Living people
Manchester Phoenix players
Moncton Alpines (QMJHL) players
Muskegon Fury players
Nottingham Panthers players
Port Huron Border Cats players
Roanoke Valley Vipers players
Saint-Hyacinthe Laser players
San Jose Sharks draft picks
Shawinigan Cataractes players
Tulsa Oilers (1992–present) players
Wichita Thunder players
Ice hockey people from Montreal
Port Huron Beacons players
Canadian expatriate ice hockey players in England
Canadian expatriate ice hockey players in the United States